Charles Francois Grenier de Lacroix, called Charles Francois Lacroix de Marseille, (circa 1700 in Marseille – 1779 or 1782, Berlin) was a French painter.

Life
Charles François Lacroix of Marseille was a landscape and marine painter, in the style of Claude Joseph Vernet, Jean-Joseph Kapeller (1702-1790) and Henry of Arles. He was a pupil and imitator of Joseph Vernet, and stayed in Rome in 1754. From 1776, he exhibited with great success and spent a good part of his life between Italy and Provence. In 1780, he published an ad to welcome students in his studio in Paris. Jean-Jacques Le Veau and Noël Le Mire engraved some of his paintings.

Gallery

References

External links
 https://americanart.si.edu/artist/charles-francois-lacroix-de-marseille-2755

18th-century French painters
Artists from Marseille
French marine artists
French landscape painters